Alexander McKenzie (born 1837) was a United States Navy Boatswain's Mate who received the Medal of Honor during the Korean Expedition.  He was wounded in the rescue of Lieutenant Hugh McKee and was struck by a sword.

Medal of Honor citation
Rank and organization: Boatswain's Mate, United States Navy. Born: 1837, Scotland. Accredited to: New York. G.O. No.: 169, February 8, 1872.

Citation:

On board the U.S.S. Colorado during the capture of the Korean forts, June 11, 1871. Fighting at the side of Lt. McKee during this action, McKenzie was struck by a sword and received a severe cut in the head from the blow.

See also
 List of Medal of Honor recipients

References

1837 births
Year of death unknown
Scottish emigrants to the United States
United States Navy Medal of Honor recipients
United States Navy sailors
Scottish-born Medal of Honor recipients
Korean Expedition (1871) recipients of the Medal of Honor
Military personnel from Glasgow

mr:अलेक्झांडर मॅकेन्झी